In the Philippines, local government is divided into three levels: provinces and independent cities, component cities and municipalities, and barangays, all of which are collectively known as local government units (LGUs). In one area, above provinces and independent cities, is an autonomous region, the Bangsamoro Autonomous Region in Muslim Mindanao. Below barangays in some cities and municipalities are sitios and puroks. All of these, with the exception of sitios and puroks, elect their own executives and legislatures. Sitios and puroks are often but not necessarily led by an elected barangay councilor.

Provinces and independent cities are organized into national government regions but those are administrative regions and not separately governed areas with their own elected governments.

According to the Constitution of the Philippines, the local governments "shall enjoy local autonomy", and in which the Philippine president exercises "general supervision". Congress enacted the Local Government Code of the Philippines in 1991 to "provide for a more responsive and accountable local government structure instituted through a system of decentralization with effective mechanisms of recall, initiative, and referendum, allocate among the different local government units their powers, responsibilities, and resources, and provide for the qualifications, election, appointment and removal, term, salaries, powers and functions and duties of local officials, and all other matters relating to the organization and operation of local units."
Local government units are under the control and supervision of the Department of the Interior and Local Government.

Levels of local government

Autonomous regions 

Autonomous regions have more powers than other local governments. The constitution limits the creation of autonomous regions to Muslim Mindanao and the Cordilleras but only one autonomous region exists: the Bangsamoro, which replaced the Autonomous Region in Muslim Mindanao (ARMM). In 1989, a plebiscite established the ARMM. In 2001, a plebiscite in the ARMM confirmed the previous composition of the autonomous region and added Basilan (except for the city of Isabela) and Marawi in Lanao del Sur. Isabela City remains a part of the province of Basilan despite rejecting inclusion in the ARMM. In 2019, another plebiscite confirmed the replacement of the ARMM with the Bangsamoro, and added Cotabato City and 63 barangays in Cotabato.

A Cordillera Autonomous Region has never been formed because two plebiscites, in 1990 and 1998, both resulted in just one province supporting autonomy; this led the Supreme Court ruling that autonomous regions should not be composed of just one province.

Each autonomous region has a unique form of government. The ARMM had a regional governor and a regional legislative assembly, mimicking the presidential system of the national government. The Bangsamoro will have a chief minister responsible to parliament, with parliament appointing a wa'lī, or a ceremonial governor, in a parliamentary system.

Provinces 

Outside the lone autonomous region, the provinces are the highest-level local government. The provinces are organized into component cities and municipalities. A province is governed by the governor and a legislature known as the Sangguniang Panlalawigan.

Cities and municipalities 

Municipal government in the Philippines is divided into three – independent cities, component cities, and municipalities (sometimes referred to as towns).  Several cities across the country are "independent cities" which means that they are not governed by a province, even though like Iloilo City the provincial capitol might be in the city. Independent city residents do not vote for nor hold provincial offices. Far more cities are component cities and are a part of a province. Municipalities are always a part of a province except for Pateros which was separated from Rizal to form Metro Manila.

Cities and municipalities are governed by mayors and legislatures, which are called the Sangguniang Panlungsod in cities and the Sangguniang Bayan in municipalities.

Barangays 

Every city and municipality in the Philippines is divided into barangays, the smallest of the local government units. Barangays can be further divided into sitios and puroks but those divisions do not have leaders elected in formal elections supervised by the national government.

A barangay's executive is the Punong Barangay or barangay captain and its legislature is the Sangguniang Barangay, composed of barangay captain, the Barangay Kagawads (barangay councilors) and the SK chairman. The SK Chairman is the head of Sangguniang Kabataan which is composed of 1 SK Chairperson and 7 SK Kagawads that also leads the assembly for youth, the Katipunan ng Kabataan or KK.

Offices
Local governments have two branches: executive and legislative.  All courts in the Philippines are under the Supreme Court of the Philippines and therefore there are no local-government controlled judicial branches.  Nor do local governments have any prosecutors or public defenders, as those are under the jurisdiction of the national government.

The executive branch is composed of the Wali as the head of region and Chief Minister as the head of government for the Bangsamoro, governor for the provinces, mayor for the cities and municipalities, and the barangay captain for the barangays.

Legislatures
The legislatures review the ordinances and resolutions enacted by the legislatures below. Aside from regular and ex-officio members, the legislatures above the barangay level also have three sectoral representatives, one each from women, agricultural or industrial workers, and other sectors.

Elected officials
All elected officials have 3-year terms, save for the wa'lī which is six years, and can only serve a maximum of three consecutive terms before being ineligible for reelection.

*a Sangguniang Kabataan official who has surpassed 21 years of age while in office is allowed to serve for the rest of the term.

Offices that are common to municipalities, cities and provinces

There are 44 offices in a government, whether it is municipal, city or provincial. There are some mandatory and optional offices to the government.

Source: Local Government Code of 1991

Responsibilities
Among the social services and facilities that local government should provide, as stipulated in Section 17 of the Local Government Code, are the following:
facilities and research services for agriculture and fishery activities, which include seedling nurseries, demonstration farms, and irrigation systems;
health services, which include access to primary health care, maternal and child care, and medicines, medical supplies and equipment;
social welfare services, which include programs and projects for women, children, elderly, and persons with disabilities, as well as vagrants, beggars, street children, juvenile delinquents, and victims of drug abuse;
information services, which include job placement information systems and a public library;
a solid waste disposal system or environmental management system;
municipal/city/provincial buildings, cultural centers, public parks, playgrounds, and sports facilities and equipment;
infrastructure facilities such as roads, bridges, school buildings, health clinics, fish ports, water supply systems, seawalls, dikes, drainage and sewerage, and traffic signals and road signs;
state/local colleges and universities;
public markets, slaughterhouses, and other local enterprises;
public cemeteries, memorial parks/gardens, and columbariums;
tourism facilities and other tourist attractions; and
sites for police and fire stations and substations and municipal jail.

Creation and modification 
As a matter of principle, higher legislative entities have the power to create, divide, merge, abolish, or substantially alter boundaries of any lower-level local government through a law or ordinance, all subject to approval by a majority of the votes cast in a plebiscite to be conducted by the Commission on Elections (COMELEC) in the local government unit or units directly affected. The Local Government Code has also set requisites for creating local government units. A summary can be found in the table below:

See also 
 List of primary local government units of the Philippines

Notes

References

Further reading
 

 
Government of the Philippines
Decentralization